Tippecanoe Township, Indiana may refer to one of the following places:

 Tippecanoe Township, Carroll County, Indiana
 Tippecanoe Township, Kosciusko County, Indiana
 Tippecanoe Township, Marshall County, Indiana
 Tippecanoe Township, Pulaski County, Indiana
 Tippecanoe Township, Tippecanoe County, Indiana

See also

Tippecanoe Township (disambiguation)

Indiana township disambiguation pages